In cartography, a trap street is a fictitious entry in the form of a misrepresented street on a map, often outside the area the map nominally covers, for the purpose of "trapping" potential plagiarists of the map who, if caught, would be unable to explain the inclusion of the "trap street" on their map as innocent. On maps that are not of streets, other "trap" features (such as nonexistent towns, or mountains with the wrong elevations) may be inserted or altered for the same purpose.

Trap streets are often nonexistent streets; but sometimes, rather than actually depicting a street where none exists, a map will misrepresent the nature of a street in a fashion that can still be used to detect copyright violators but is less likely to interfere with navigation. For instance, a map might add nonexistent bends to a street, or depict a major street as a narrow lane, without changing its location or its connections to other streets.

Trap streets are rarely acknowledged by publishers. One known case is a popular driver's atlas for the city of Athens, Greece, which has a warning inside its front cover that potential copyright violators should beware of trap streets.

Examples 

In an edition of the BBC Two programme Map Man, first broadcast 17 October 2005, a spokesperson for the Geographers' A-Z Map Company claimed there are "about 100" trap streets included in the London A-Z Street atlas. One such street, "Bartlett Place", a genuine but misnamed walkway (named after Kieran Bartlett, an employee at Geographers’ A-Z Map Company), was identified in the programme and will appear in future editions under its real name, Broadway Walk.

It has been suggested that Google Earth placed Sandy Island, New Caledonia, as the geographical analogue to a trap street, although historical evidence implies that it originated as a cartographical error and Google simply passed the error along.

Legal issues 
Trap streets are not copyrightable under the federal law of the United States.  In Nester's Map & Guide Corp. v. Hagstrom Map Co. (1992), a United States federal court found that copyright traps are not themselves protectable by copyright. There, the court stated: "[t]o treat 'false' facts interspersed among actual facts and represented as actual facts as fiction would mean that no one could ever reproduce or copy actual facts without risk of reproducing a false fact and thereby violating a copyright ... If such were the law, information could never be reproduced or widely disseminated."  (Id. at 733)

In a 2001 case, The Automobile Association in the United Kingdom agreed to settle a case for £20,000,000 when it was caught copying Ordnance Survey maps. In this case, the identifying "fingerprints" were not deliberate errors but rather stylistic features such as the width of roads.

In another case, the Singapore Land Authority sued Virtual Map, an online publisher of maps, for infringing on its copyright. The Singapore Land Authority stated in its case that there were deliberate errors in maps they had provided to Virtual Map years earlier. Virtual Map denied this and insisted that it had done its own cartography.

Cultural references
The 1979 science fiction novel The Ultimate Enemy by Fred Saberhagen includes the short story "The Annihilation of Angkor Apeiron" in which a salesman allows a draft of a new Encyclopedia Galactica to be captured by alien war machines. It leads them to believe there is a nearby planet ripe for attack, but the planet is actually a copyright trap and the aliens are led away from inhabited worlds, saving millions of lives.

The 2010 novel Kraken by China Miéville features the trap streets of the London A-Z being places where the magical denizens of the city can exist without risk of being disturbed by normal folk.

A 2013 film, Trap Street, inverts the usual meaning of a trap street, becoming a real street which is deliberately obscured or removed from a map—and anyone who attempts to identify it by placing it on public record is then "trapped".

The 2015 Doctor Who episode "Face the Raven" features a hidden street where alien asylum seekers have taken shelter. Due to a psychic field that subconsciously makes observers ignore it, outsiders consider it a trap street when they see it on maps. One scene involves the character Clara Oswald discussing the definition of "trap street". The episode's working title was also "Trap Street".

See also
 Agloe, New York
 Argleton
 Beatosu and Goblu, Ohio
 Honeytoken
 Paper street
 Phantom settlement
 Fictitious entry
 Watermark

References

External links 
 
 Copyright Easter Eggs at OpenStreetMap

Fictitious entries
Intellectual property law
Cartography
Streets
Fictional streets and roads
Plagiarism detectors